Carla J. Sands (née Herd; born October 13, 1960) is an American businesswoman who is chair and CEO of Vintage Capital Group. During the Trump administration (2017–21) she was U.S. ambassador to Denmark.

A former chiropractor, socialite, and actress, Sands married business executive Fred Sands in 1999. Following his death in 2015, she succeeded him as chair and CEO of Vintage Capital Group. During Donald Trump's 2016 presidential campaign, she was an economic advisor to Trump and a major donor to his campaign and inaugural committee.

Sands was a candidate in the Republican primary in the 2022 United States Senate election in Pennsylvania.

Early life and education 
Sands was born Carla J. Herd, daughter of Jack (a chiropractor) and Barbara Herd, on October 13, 1960. She grew up in Mechanicsburg, Pennsylvania. Sands attended Cumberland Valley High School, where she was active in student council, the ski club, and various other student-led organizations. She studied art and science at Indiana University of Pennsylvania and chemistry at Elizabethtown College, but it is unclear whether she earned a degree from either institution. She later attended Life Chiropractic College, now Life University, and earned a Doctor of Chiropractic degree.

Career 
Sands had a brief career in acting in the 1980s, appearing in several episodes of the television series The Bold and the Beautiful in 1987 and in two movies, the 1988 sword and sorcery fantasy film Deathstalker and the Warriors from Hell and the 1989 South African action film Wild Zone.

Sands worked as a chiropractor in private practice from 1990 to 1999. On April 10, 1999, Sands married real estate mogul Fred Sands. Following his death in 2015, she succeeded him as the chair and CEO of Vintage Capital Group, which has around $150 million in assets, and of Vintage Real Estate.

Politics
She is a Republican fundraiser and donor; she supported the 2016 presidential campaign of Donald Trump. In 2016, Sands donated nearly a quarter-million dollars and organized high-dollar fundraisers for Trump's campaign, and subsequently gave $100,000 to Trump's inaugural committee. Sands was previously an economic advisor to Trump; she was one of eight women that Trump added to his economic advisory council after he faced criticism for initially naming an all-male slate.

Sands was a California delegate for the 33rd congressional district to the 2016 Republican National Convention.

After the 2020 presidential election, Sands wrote twice on Twitter that she was "disenfranchised" because her absentee ballot in Pennsylvania was "not counted". The New York Times reported that when they ran a search on Pennsylvania's election website with Sands's information, it showed that her ballot had been received and counted in Cumberland County.

U.S. Ambassador to Denmark 

Trump nominated Sands to the post of U.S. Ambassador to the Kingdom of Denmark. According to two unnamed sources her name was allegedly recommended to Trump by the Republican fundraiser and convicted felon Elliott Broidy. She was confirmed by the United States Senate on November 2, 2017, on a voice vote. She formally assumed the office on December 15, 2017.

While serving as Ambassador, Sands published an opinion piece in Denmark accusing the country of spending too little on its military.

In December 2019, she caused controversy by vetoing the presence of Stanley Sloan, a scholar of the NATO alliance, at a Danish Atlantic Council conference that was meant to celebrate the 70th anniversary of NATO and discuss its future. Sloan had been invited by the head of the Council, Lars Struwe, to give the keynote address at the conference. Days before the conference, Sands objected to Sloan speaking because he had criticized Trump. The Danish Atlantic Council subsequently canceled the conference.

Struwe wrote to Sloan that "we believe that freedom of speech is paramount in every democracy" and that the think tank saw no conflict between Sloan's criticism of Trump and his participation as a speaker at a conference. The U.S. Embassy posted a Twitter message saying that the "proposed last-minute inclusion" of Sloan into the conference did not comply with the "agreement that we followed when recruiting all other speakers." The Embassy offered no proof of that allegation, however, and Struwe said that the process alluded to by the U.S. Embassy for recruiting speakers did not exist. According to Struwe, the U.S. Embassy did not play a role in choosing any of the conference's other speakers or in confirming whether they would attend the conference.

In June 2020, Sands participated in re-opening the United States consulate in Nuuk, Greenland, along with Secretary of State Mike Pompeo.

The independent, non-partisan Office of Special Counsel ruled in February 2021 that Sands violated the Hatch Act of 1939 multiple times while serving as Ambassador to the Kingdom of Denmark by using her official Twitter account to tweet about political matters, including criticisms of Joe Biden and endorsing conspiracy theories about Kamala Harris.

During Trump's last month in office, Sands received the Medal for Distinguished Public Service from the Department of Defense for her tenure as Ambassador.

In June 2022, Sands was widely ridiculed for tweeting, in reference to high fuel prices, that "In Denmark, middle class people can’t afford to drive a car. They have a bike and take the train for long trips. My embassy driver would bike an hour in the snow to get to work. That’s the future team Biden wants for Americans”, she wrote and continued: “Is this what you want?"

2022 U.S. Senate campaign

In July 2021, Sands announced she was entering the Republican primary for the Senate seat of Pat Toomey. As of January 2022, Sands had put $3 million of her own money into her U.S. Senate campaign and had spent $1 million on television advertisements. Sands came fourth in the primary, behind Mehmet Oz, David McCormick, and Kathy Barnette.

Additional affiliations 
Sands served on the boards of Pepperdine University, the Los Angeles Museum of Contemporary Arts, the Library Foundation of Los Angeles and the Los Angeles Philharmonic. She was also named by Governor Arnold Schwarzenegger to be on the board of the California Cultural and Historical Endowment. Sands served as the President and Chairman of Blue Ribbon, an organization that supports the Los Angeles Music Center and also as a Director of the Performing Arts Center of Los Angeles County.

Personal life
Sands has one child, a daughter named Alexandra.

Filmography

Film

Television

Electoral history

References

External links

 Campaign website
 Vintage Capital Group, LLC
 Vintage Real Estate
 

1960 births
Ambassadors of the United States to Denmark
American chiropractors
American women ambassadors
American women business executives
California Republicans
Controversies of the 2020 United States presidential election
Life University alumni
Living people
Place of birth missing (living people)
Trump administration personnel
Trump administration controversies
21st-century American businesswomen
21st-century American businesspeople
Candidates in the 2022 United States Senate elections
Pennsylvania Republicans
Women in Pennsylvania politics